A flag flying day is a day, when it is decreed, either officially or by tradition, that the national flag should be hoisted by every official agency in the country and private citizens and corporations are also recommended to fly the national flag, thus for those days neither leaving the flag staff empty nor using their own family or corporate flags. There may also be flag flying days observed for some provincial flags.

As opposed to the Flag Day, of which there is usually only one in each country in the year and on which the flag itself is celebrated, there are a number of flag flying days in a country during the year, celebrating different national holidays or other national festive days.

For flag flying days in different countries, see
 Flag flying days in Estonia
 Flag flying days in Finland
 Flag flying days in Germany
 Flag flying days in Lithuania
 Flag flying days in Mexico
 Flag flying days in the Netherlands
 Flag flying days in Norway
 Flag flying days in Sweden
 Flag flying days in the United Kingdom
 Flag flying days in the United States

See also
 Dance of Flags, Israeli celebration
 Flag Day

References

Flags
 
Flag practices
Observances